Harry Lyon is a New Zealand musician and songwriter. He first came to prominence as a member of the band Hello Sailor after playing with Christchurch top 40 band Beam.

After Hello Sailor, Lyon formed Coup D'État with Jan Preston, Neil Hannan and Steve Osborne (who was replaced by Paul Dunningham after a short time).  They were awarded the 1981 RIANZ Single of the Year for "Dr I Like Your Medicine".  The band split the following year.

In 1982 Graham Brazier formed the Legionnaires and Lyon joined a revised line-up, but Brazier suddenly formed a new band.  Lyon joined Dave McArtney in the Pink Flamingos for a short time.

He appeared in the feature film Should I Be Good in 1984, playing Nat Goodman, a former drug dealer just released from prison.  Nat sang in nightclubs so Lyon also contributed music to the film.

Hello Sailor reformed for the opening of the renovated Gluepot in 1985 and, following the success of the performances, began touring again.

Lyon has an MCPA (Hons) (Master of Creative & Performing Arts) from the University of Auckland and is currently Director of MAINZ (Music and Audio Institute of New Zealand).

In May 2017, according to musician Delaney Davidson, Lyon is recording a solo album.

Aotearoa Music Awards 
The Aotearoa Music Awards (previously known as New Zealand Music Awards (NZMA)) are an annual awards night celebrating excellence in New Zealand music and have been presented annually since 1965.

! 
|-
| 2011 || Harry Lyon (as part of Hello Sailor) || New Zealand Music Hall of Fame ||  || 
|-

References

 Dix, John, Stranded in Paradise, Penguin, 2005. 
 Eggleton, David, Ready To Fly, Craig Potton, 2003. 
 Martin, Helen and Edwards, Sam, New Zealand Film 1912–1996, Oxford, 1997. 
 Spittle, Gordon, Counting The Beat, GP Publications, 1997.

External links

Harry Lyon on the Hello Sailor website
Harry Lyon at Music and Audio Institute of New Zealand

1950 births
Living people
New Zealand songwriters
Male songwriters
University of Auckland alumni
21st-century New Zealand musicians
20th-century New Zealand musicians
20th-century male musicians
21st-century male musicians